F.I.S.T.: Forged In Shadow Torch is a 2021 metroidvania video game developed by TiGames and published by Bilibili. It was released on PlayStation 4 and PlayStation 5 on September 7, 2021, followed by a Windows port on October 3, 2021. The game launched on the Nintendo Switch in July 2022. The game follows Rayton, an anthropomorphic rabbit and former ace pilot who, using a giant mechanical fist, rising up against the robotic Legion that has invaded Torch City in an effort to liberate it from its oppressors. The game received positive reviews from critics, citing its graphics, world and gameplay.

Reception 

F.I.S.T. received "generally favorable reviews" on Metacritic for the PlayStation 5, Windows, and Switch versions. The PlayStation 4 version of the game received "mixed or average reviews".

Marcus Stewart of Game Informer rated the game 8.5/10, calling it "another fine example of an exploration-focused side-scroller". He praised the combat and multiple unlockable weapons, though he criticized the game's dearth of fast travel points.

John Cal McCormick of Push Square rated the game 8/10 stars, praising the graphics as "astonishing" and the characters as charming, but called some of the game's translation "clunky".

Jeremy Peeples of Hardcore Gamer rated the game 4/5, calling it a "must-buy for Metroidvania fans" with a "richer storyline than most", also saying it "controls like a dream". He compared the gameplay to Shatterhand, while calling the world reminiscent of Beyond Good & Evil.

Notes

References

External links 
Official website

2021 video games
Action video games
Adventure games
Bilibili
Dieselpunk video games
Metroidvania games
Nintendo Switch games
PlayStation 4 games
PlayStation 5 games
Side-scrolling video games
Single-player video games
Science fiction video games
Steampunk video games
Unreal Engine games
Video games about rabbits and hares
Video games developed in China
Windows games